Dihammaphora parana' is a species of beetle in the family Cerambycidae. It was described by Gemminger in 1873.

References

Dihammaphora
Beetles described in 1873